the Battle of Manu was a major battle that was fought in early May 896 near the fort of Manu (Ad Ammonem site, modern Mellita 24 km west of Sabratha, Libya) between the forces of the Aghlabid Emir Ibrahim II and the forces of the Nafusa tribe.

Aftermath 

After the battle, the Aghlabids attacked Qansara, a city and a Rustamid locality located in the vicinity of Nefta either by Ibrahim personally right after the battle or by his son Abu l-'Abbas in august-September 897. Its in this city where around 500 inhabitants including 80 scholars were imprisoned and brought back to Ifriqiya where they were massacred and gruesomely executed by Ibrahim.

The disaster at Manu marked the end of Rustamid rule over Jebal Nafusa as the Nafusa deposed their Rustamid govenor Aflah ibn al-Abbas and replaced him by his cousin who himself was later replaced by Aflah. In the years following the defeat at Manu, Abdallah ibn al-Khayr became the Hakim of Jebel Nafusa.

See also 

 Rustamid Dynasty
 Aghlabids

References 

History of Libya